Sabane may be,

Sabane language, Brazil
Sabane Station, Iwate, Japan